Hlinka (feminine Hlinková) is a Czech and Slovak surname. Notable people with the surname include:

Andrej Hlinka, Slovak politician and Catholic priest
Ivan Hlinka, Czech ice hockey player and coach
Jaroslav Hlinka, Czech ice hockey player
Jiri Hlinka, piano professor at the Grieg Academy of Music in Bergen
Marek Hlinka, Slovak footballer
Martin Hlinka, Slovak ice hockey player
Michal Hlinka, Czech ice hockey player
Miroslav Hlinka, Slovak ice hockey player
Peter Hlinka, Slovak footballer

Fictional characters:
Paulina Hlinka, a fictional character in the Bert Diaries

Places
Hlinka (Bruntál District), village and municipality in the Czech Republic

See also
 
 Glinka (disambiguation)

Czech-language surnames
Slovak-language surnames